Abrams Mountain, also known as Mount Abram or Mount Abrams, is a  mountain summit located on the shared boundary of Ouray County with San Juan County in southwest Colorado, United States. It is situated four miles south of the town of Ouray, on land managed by Uncompahgre National Forest. It is part of the  San Juan Mountains, which are a subset of the Rocky Mountains, and is west of the Continental Divide. Historic mines are located on the slopes of Abrams Mountain. This iconic feature of the Ouray landscape can be seen for many miles while driving Highway 550 south from Montrose toward Ouray, and it dominates the San Juan Skyway from Red Mountain Pass to Ironton Park.

Etymology 

The mountain's name, which has been officially adopted by the United States Board on Geographic Names, was in use before 1906 when Henry Gannett published it in the Gazetteer of Colorado. The name commemorates Abram Cutler (born November 2, 1832), the first judge of Ouray County and notary public who administered the oath to Ouray's original town board. Originally a civil engineer, he assisted Ferdinand Vandeveer Hayden with the 1874 survey of this area, so the possibility exists that Hayden named the mountain to honor Cutler. The nearby Cutler Creek which is just north of Ouray was also named for Abram Cutler, and the Cutler Formation takes it name from the creek.

Climate 
According to the Köppen climate classification system, Abrams Mountain is located in an alpine subarctic climate zone with long, cold, snowy winters, and cool to warm summers. Due to its altitude, it receives precipitation all year, as snow in winter, and as thunderstorms in summer, with a dry period in late spring. Precipitation runoff from the mountain drains into the Uncompahgre River.

Gallery

See also

References

External links 

 Weather forecast: Abrams Mountain

Mountains of San Juan County, Colorado
Mountains of Ouray County, Colorado
San Juan Mountains (Colorado)
Mountains of Colorado
North American 3000 m summits
Uncompahgre National Forest